Afonso Ferreira Caetano (born 11 March 1997) is a Portuguese footballer who plays for União Leiria as a midfielder.

Club career
On 29 April 2018, Caetano made his professional debut with Braga B in a 2017–18 LigaPro match against FC Porto B.

References

External links

1997 births
Living people
People from Almeirim
Portuguese footballers
Association football midfielders
Liga Portugal 2 players
Segunda Divisão players
U.D. Leiria players
S.C. Braga B players
Sportspeople from Santarém District